Howard Williams(1942-2003)

Williams worked with the Basil Brush character on the Basil Brush Show.

References

British television presenters
Possibly living people
1942 births